3401 Vanphilos, provisional designation , is a stony, eccentric asteroid and sizeable Mars-crosser, approximately 7 kilometers in diameter. It was discovered on 1 August 1981, by and at Harvard's Oak Ridge Observatory (Agassiz Station) in Massachusetts, United States.

Orbit and classification 

Vanphilos orbits the Sun in the inner main-belt at a distance of 1.5–3.2 AU once every 3 years and 8 months (1,330 days). Its orbit has an eccentricity of 0.36 and an inclination of 22° with respect to the ecliptic.

Physical characteristics 

In the SMASS taxonomy, Vanphilos is characterized as a common S-type asteroid.

Rotation period 

In February and March 2008, three rotational lightcurves of Vanphilos were obtained from photometric observations by astronomers Petr Pravec, James W. Brinsfield and Robert Stephens. Light-curve analysis gave a well defined rotation period of 4.225 and 4.226 hours, respectively, with a change in brightness between 0.50 and 0.54 magnitude.

In August 2014, astronomer Brian Warner derived a concurring period of 4.227 hours with an amplitude of 0.62 magnitude from his observations taken at the Palmer Divide Station in Colorado. Light-curve plots were published on-line by the Ondřejov Observatory and the Center for Solar System Studies.

Diameter and albedo 

According to the survey carried out by NASA's Wide-field Infrared Survey Explorer with its subsequent NEOWISE mission, Vanphilos measures 7.02 and 7.10 kilometers in diameter, and its surface has an albedo of 0.377 and 0.31, respectively. The Collaborative Asteroid Lightcurve Link assumes a standard albedo for stony asteroids of 0.20 and calculates a diameter of 10.30 kilometers, as the lower the body's albedo (reflectivity), the larger its diameter, at a constant absolute magnitude.

Naming 

This minor planet was named for Vanessa Hall and Philip Osborne, by astronomer G. V. William to celebrate their marriage on 3 August 1991. The approved naming citation was published by the Minor Planet Center on 25 August 1991.

Notes

References

External links 
 Asteroid Lightcurve Database (LCDB), query form (info )
 Dictionary of Minor Planet Names, Google books
 Asteroids and comets rotation curves, CdR – Observatoire de Genève, Raoul Behrend
 Discovery Circumstances: Numbered Minor Planets (1)-(5000) – Minor Planet Center
 
 

003401
003401
Named minor planets
003401
19810801